is a Japanese manga series written and illustrated by Takayuki Mizushina. It was serialized in Kodansha's Evening from April 2011 to September 2020, with its chapters collected in seventeen tankōbon volumes. It tells the story of Muco, the Shiba Inu of glassblower Komatsu-san.

Characters

The shiba-inu pet of Komatsu.

A glassblower.

A bar patron and friend of Komatsu.

A local barkeep.

Bouda's daughter.

Love interest.

Media

Manga
Lovely Muco is written and illustrated by Takayuki Mizushina. The manga began in Kodansha's Evening on 12 April 2011. In June 2020, it was announced that the series would be finished in 6 chapters. The manga finished on 23 September 2020. Kodansha has collected its chapters into individual tankōbon volumes. The first volume was released on 23 April 2012 As of 23 November 2020, seventeen volumes have been released.

At Anime Expo 2022, Kodansha USA announced that they licensed the series for English publication.

Volume list

Anime
In 2013 and 2014, a short anime based on the manga by Doga Kobo was used as interstitials on the Fuji TV programme Non-Stop!. A separate anime series started airing on October 3, 2015.

Reception
Lovely Muco ranked #6 on the "Nationwide Bookstore Employees' Recommended Comics of 2013" poll by Honya Club online bookstore.

References

External links
  
 TAKAYUKI MIZUSHINA Web・SINAMISM・ - （Official website）
 
 Lovely Muuuuuuuco! - Fuji Television On Demand
 TV animation Itoshino MUCO Official website
 

2011 manga
Comics about dogs
Doga Kobo
Fuji TV original programming
Kodansha manga
Seinen manga
Slice of life anime and manga
TV Tokyo original programming